The San Juan Express (also known as simply the San Juan) was a narrow gauge train that ran on the  Denver & Rio Grande Western Railroad (D&RGW) route from Durango, Colorado via Chama, New Mexico; Cumbres Pass; and Antonito, Colorado to Alamosa, Colorado. The train ran from February 11, 1937 until January 31, 1951 as train numbers 115 and 116, though towards the end of the passenger service it took on the number 215 and 216.  

The railroad line was closed by the D&RGW in 1968 and much of the narrow gauge trackage has since been abandoned. The line from Antonito to Alamosa is now standard gauge only and belongs to the San Luis and Rio Grande Railroad. Normally, from Alamosa to Chama, a D&RGW K-36 (Or K-37) class locomotive, either 482, 483, 484, 485, 488, or 489 would haul the 4 to 5 car consist. At Chama, the K-36 and their crew would be swapped out with a D&RGW K-28 and their crews would take over from Chama, to Durango. On the return journey it would be the other way around. However, there is photographic evidence of a K-36 locomotive hauling the train the entire length. 

Normally, the train would be 4 cars long, which consisted of a Railway Post Office Car, or RPO for short, a Baggage Car, a Passenger Car, and a Parlor Car. But there is photographic evidence of the train having as many as 8 cars.

According to a 1941 timetable, The Westbound train would depart Alamosa at 7:00 A.M., arrive at Antonito at 8:05 AM, Chama at 11:15 A.M., and Arrive at Durango at 4:05 P.M. The Eastbound would depart Durango at 11:15 A.M.,  Arrive at Chama at 4:05 P.M., Arrive at Antonito at 7:25 P.M., and arrive at Alamosa at 8:30 P.M.,

Frequently used engines 

One of the most frequently used locomotives on this route was and still is the steam wheel arrangement 2-8-2 D&RGW K-36 Mikado type. Other locomotives used on this route included the D&RGW K-27, the D&RGW K-28, and the D&RGW K-37, and occasionally the D&RGW C-18.  One K-27 and one K-37 are used on the Cumbres & Toltec, with C-18 D&RGW 315 periodically visiting both the Durango and Silverton and the Cumbres & Toltec railroads.

Sections used today 
The Cumbres & Toltec Scenic Railroad uses the portion from Antonito to Chama. The portion from Durango to Silverton (not part of the San Juan Express) is run by the Durango & Silverton Narrow Gauge Railroad.  The line from Antonito to Alamosa is now standard gauge only and belongs to the San Luis and Rio Grande Railroad.

See also
 San Juan Extension
 Sublette Station
 Union Depot (Pueblo, Colorado)
 List of Denver and Rio Grande Western Railroad lines

References 

Illustrated book of Steam and Rail, Garrat, Colin and Matthews, Max-Wade, Barnes & Noble Books, New York (2003)

External links 
 Cumbres and Toltec Scenic Railroad
 D&RGW K-36 class

1937 establishments in the United States
1951 disestablishments in the United States
Passenger trains of the Denver and Rio Grande Western Railroad
Passenger rail transportation in Colorado
Passenger rail transportation in New Mexico
Railway services introduced in 1937